The International Journal of Theoretical and Applied Finance was founded in 1998 and is published by World Scientific. It covers the use of quantitative tools in finance, including articles on development and simulation of mathematical models, their industrial usage, and application of modern stochastic methods.

Abstracting and indexing 
The journal is abstracted and indexed in:
 JEL electronic indexes, includes EconList, e-JEL, and JEL on CD
 Social Science Research Network (SSRN)
 Mathematical Reviews
 The CFA Digest
 CSA Risk Abstracts
 International Bibliography of the Social Sciences
 Zentralblatt MATH
 Inspec

Finance journals
Publications established in 1998
World Scientific academic journals
English-language journals